The 2022 South and Central American Men's Club Handball Championship the 3rd edition of this tournament was held in Villa Ballester, Argentina from 24 to 28 May 2022. It acted as a qualifying tournament for the 2022 IHF Men's Super Globe.

Participating teams
 San Fernando HA
 SAG Villa Ballester
 Municipal of Maipú
 Handebol Taubaté
 EC Pinheiros
 USAB handball
 Ovalle Handball
 Club Olimpia
 German School of Montevideo

Preliminary round
All times are local (UTC–3).

Group A

Group B

Group C

Knockout stage

Bracket

5–9th place quarterfinal

5–9th place semifinals

Semifinals

Seventh place game

Fifth place game

Third place game

Final

Final standing

All-star team

Source:

References

South and Central American Men's Club Handball Championship
International handball competitions hosted by Argentina
South and Central American Men's Club Handball Championship
South and Central American Men's Club Handball Championship